The Rolladen-Schneider LS7 is a high-performance Standard Class single-seat sailplane produced by Rolladen-Schneider Flugzeugbau GmbH from 1988 to 1993.

Design and development
The LS7 was developed as the successor to the LS4, one of the most successful gliders ever produced.

In a departure from the design philosophy of the LS4, Rolladen-Schneider set out to design the LS7 as an uncompromised competition machine, seeking the highest performance possible with the technology of the time. Designer Wolf Lemke specified a highly laminar wing profile and developed a high aspect ratio wing. Carbon fibre was extensively used in the construction, along with aramid fibre, to ensure enough strength in spite of slender structural elements and increased loadings. The aileron drive bellcranks were entirely concealed within the wings, with a mere 30mm of usable height at the trailing edge.

The LS7 prototype flew for the first time in the autumn of 1987, and serial production started in 1988. Winglets were introduced in 1991, yielding the LS7-WL. Many earlier LS7s were converted to this standard. Production ended in 1993 with only 164 aircraft having been built.

The LS7 did not enjoy the commercial and sporting success its advanced features seemed to warrant. Its intrinsically higher thermalling speeds proved to be a handicap in the gaggling environment typical of competition gliding.

Other gliders designed at about the same time following a similar design philosophy also revealed non-classic low-speed behaviour, e.g. the ASW 24 and the DG-600. These gliders climb better in thermals when flown significantly above stall speed and achieve the best cross-country speeds at relatively moderate wing loadings, factors which were not fully understood at first. Although experience over the years has shown these gliders to be equal to any when flown by an expert hand, manufacturers nonetheless have returned to more conservative wing profiles and (mostly) lower aspect ratios.

The LS7 was superseded by the LS8, which is currently manufactured at DG Flugzeugbau GmbH. The LS7 remains a much prized glider among private owners for its excellent performance and very nimble flight characteristics.

The LS7 has more recently begun to achieve competition success in the Club Class, placing 1st in the 2019 European Gliding Championships, Slovakia.

Design features
 Wings: spar and shell of foam / carbon reinforced plastic sandwich
 Ailerons: synthetic foam / aramid reinforced plastic sandwich. Ailerons extend over fully half the wing span.
 Horizontal stabilizer: sparless sandwich of carbon reinforced plastic
 Elevator: carbon/aramid reinforced plastic
 Automatic connections for ailerons, airbrakes, elevator and water ballast valves
 Integral Teflon and PET film seals on all control surface gaps.
 Water ballast system: one unvented ballast bag per wing located before the spar, valve and dumping orifice on the lower wing shell by the wing root. Glass reinforced ballast tank installed in the tail fin for correction of centre of gravity shifts due to wing ballast.

Specifications

See also

References

LS-Flugzeugbau website
Milan J P, LS7 - Une valeur sûre, Vôl à Voile, 1997
Thomas F, Fundamentals of Sailplane Design, College Park Press, 1999
Simons M, Segelflugzeuge 1965-2000, Eqip, 2004
Flight report by F Formosa
Sailplane Directory

1980s German sailplanes
Rolladen-Schneider aircraft
Aircraft first flown in 1987
T-tail aircraft